Sylvester Gray (born July 8, 1967) is an American former professional basketball player. He was selected by the Miami Heat in the second round (35th overall) of the 1988 NBA draft. A 6'6" small forward from Memphis State University, Gray played in only one NBA season.

As a member of the Heat during the 1988–89 season, he appeared in 55 games and averaged 8.0 ppg. Gray was the 4th ever draft pick in Miami Heat history.

He also played for CBA's Yakima Sun Kings, the Turkish club Fenerbahçe. He also suited up for the Alaska Aces and Ginebra San Miguel (Anejo Rhum) of the Philippine Basketball Association, coached by former player Robert Jaworski.

External links
Career stats

1967 births
Living people
American expatriate basketball people in Italy
American expatriate basketball people in the Philippines
American expatriate basketball people in Turkey
American men's basketball players
Barangay Ginebra San Miguel players
Basketball players from Tennessee
Cedar Rapids Silver Bullets players
Fenerbahçe men's basketball players
Memphis Tigers men's basketball players
Mens Sana Basket players
Miami Heat draft picks
Miami Heat players
Parade High School All-Americans (boys' basketball)
People from Millington, Tennessee
Philippine Basketball Association imports
Rapid City Thrillers players
Scaligera Basket Verona players
Small forwards
TED Ankara Kolejliler players
Victoria Libertas Pallacanestro players
Yakima Sun Kings players
Alaska Aces (PBA) players